The Water skiing competition at the 2010 Central American and Caribbean Games was held in Mayagüez, Puerto Rico. 

The tournament was scheduled to be held on 24 July at Bogotá in Colombia.

Medal summary

Men's events

External links

Events at the 2010 Central American and Caribbean Games
July 2010 sports events in North America
2010
Central